This is a list of museums in Tonga.

 Afā Eli Historical Museum and Research Library
Tonga Maritime Museum
 Tonga National Museum
 Tonga Traditions Committee
 Tuku'aho Memorial Museum

See also 
 List of libraries in Tonga
 List of archives in Tonga
 List of museums by country

External links 
 http://www.collectionsaustralia.net/pima/index.php?region=21

Tonga
 
Tonga
Museums